"Fuck U Betta" (stylized as "F**k U Betta"), also known as "Love U Betta" or "F U Betta" in clean versions, is the debut single by British singer Neon Hitch. The song was released as the first single from her now unreleased debut album Beg, Borrow & Steal. The song reached number one on the Billboard Hot Dance Club Play chart and number 29 on the Billboard Pop Songs chart.

Background and release
Discussing the inspiration of the song, Hitch said:

"Fuck U Betta" was digitally released on 31 January 2012.

Composition
Lewis Corner of Digital Spy described the composition as "a quirky mix of squiffy vocal effects, pulsing club beats and plenty of bad language".

Chart performance
On its sixth week in the chart, "Fuck U Betta" reached number one on the Billboard Hot Dance Club Play chart for the issue dated 17 March 2012. According to Nielsen SoundScan, the song had sold 28,000 downloads by March 2012.

Music video
The official music video for "Fuck U Betta" was directed by Chris Applebaum. It shows Hitch in black and white backgrounds sitting on a chair. A scene includes Hitch on the floor with black paint spilling on her. It was uploaded onto Hitch's official YouTube channel on 8 March 2012 in both explicit and clean versions. The video has been taken down as of December 17, 2018 by her previous label for unknown reasons.

Track listing

Charts

Weekly charts

Release history

See also
 List of number-one dance singles of 2012 (U.S.)

References

2012 debut singles
Music videos directed by Chris Applebaum
Songs written by Lauren Christy
Reprise Records singles
2011 songs
Song recordings produced by Benny Blanco
Songs written by Neon Hitch